Motiram Bhatta (1866–1896) (1923–1953 BS) was a Nepalese poet, singer, essayist, publisher, literary critic and biographer. He also introduced the Ghazal style of poetry and singing in Nepal. Bhatta was a polyglot and alongside Nepali, he had studied in Sanskrit, Persian, English and was also proficient in Bengali, Urdu and Nepal Bhasa.

He wrote Kabi Bhanubhakta Ko Jivan Charitra— the biography of Bhanubhakta Acharya, which played an significant role in establishing Acharya as the first poet (Aadi Kabi) of Nepali language. He is considered one of the seventeen national heroes (Rastriya Bibhuti) of Nepal and was given the title Yuba Kabi (Young Poet). The 1883 to 1919 period of Nepali literature is known as Motiram Era.

Early life in Benaras 
Bhatta was born on the day of Kushe Aunsi (new moon day of Hindu month Bhadra) on 8 September 1866 (25 Bhadra 1923 BS) in Bhesiko Tole, Kathmandu, Nepal as the second son to father Pandit Daya Ram Bhatta and mother Ripu Mardini Devi Bhatta. At the age of six he left his birthplace, Kathmandu, with his mother to receive education in Benaras, India. He was admitted to a Persian language school, where he learnt Farsi and Urdu. His Bratabanda ceremony was also performed in Benaras. He became acquinted to Bharatendu Harishchandra in Benaras and studied under him. He started writing and singing ghazals at this period. He also started learning music and played Sitar. He learnt Sitar from Pannalal, a famous Sitar player in Benaras. He wrote around 400 Shayaris when he was in Benaras.

Marriage 
After marriage, he stayed in Kathmandu for a some time. Until he returned to Kathmandu, he had not written any songs or poem in Nepali language but when he came back, he started to learn about the Nepalese singing tradition. He was charmed by the folk duet song (Dohori) sung in rural Nepal.

While in Kathmandu, he attended the wedding ceremony of his neighbour Khadga Dutta Pandey. In the ceremony, he heard a poem of Bhanubhakta Acharya being recited by the wedding guests. The wedding guest sang those poem throughout the night. He discovered that those songs were written by Bhanubhakta Acharya. He liked the poem so much that he was determined to find out other poems and works of Bhanubhakta Acharya.

Return to Benaras 
He returned to Benaras with his wife in December 1881 (Poush 1938 BS). He started studying English in Harischandra school in Benaras. In his second stay at Benaras, he attended various poetry meetings. One such meeting was organized by Bharatendu Harishchandra on samasyāpūrtis, an old poetic tradition involving riddles. Samasyāpūrtis were an early Indian tradition often organized in palaces of kings and nobles. It is said that in one of the samasyāpūrtis meeting, Bhatta presented a solution and was awarded ten rupees by Harishchandra. Impressed by such meeting, Bhatta started a group himself called Samasyāpūrti–maṇḍalī, which consisted of Padmavilas Panta, Kashinath, Ranganath, Tejbahadur Rana, and Chet Singh. In the group meetings, he started composing poems using erotic or romantic style (Sringara ras in Sanskrit). The style attracted numbers of publications among readers and was considered successful.

In Benaras, he published and edited a Nepali language edition of Bharat Jeevan magazine. He also started printing Nepali language books in the Bharat Jeevan Printing Press. He first published the Balakanda of Bhanubhakta Ramayan and printed the complete edition later.

In 1886, he started Gorkha Bharat Jeevan, a Nepali language magazine. It is considered to be the first newsmagazine published in Nepali. However, no copies of the magazine have been found to date. The only evidence of the existence of the magazine is the advertisement of the magazine in Bharat Jeevan magazine.

Return to Kathmandu 
After returning, Bhatta with the help of his maternal uncles Pt. At the same time, he opened a library which is considered the first library in Nepal. The company later opened a press known as Pashupat press.

He alongside Nara Dev Pandey, Laxmi Dutta Panta, Gopi Nath Lohani, Bhoj Raj Pandey and other friends and acquaintances started a group in Kathmandu called Mitra Mandali, inspired by his group in Benaras. The group was responsible for the creation and promotion of Nepali poetry. Bhatta studied in Durbar High School in Kathmandu. He was friends with Chandra Shumsher JBR and Dev Shumsher JBR at school. The liberal views of Dev Shumsher is said to be influenced by Bhatta. For his higher education, he decided to go to Calcutta.

Calcutta and death 
In , he passed the entrance examination of Calcutta University. He appeared for the AAIA exam in  but was unable to pass. He returned to his home. He went back to Kolkata in  but got ill. He returned to Kathmandu due to his illness. He became bedridden for seven months and died in 1896 (1953 BS) on the day of Kunse Aunsi, his lunar birthday at the age of 30. He was cremated at Aryaghat on the banks of Bagmati river.

Literary contributions
He is credited to introduce prose writing in Nepali literature. He wrote essays, plays and stories in the Nepali language. In poetry he mostly used Sringar ras, which is considered a romantic style.

He worked for 15 years in Nepali literature. During that period he wrote and edited about twenty–five literary works. He also published works by other authors.

Some of the works of Motiram are Manodweg Prawah, Panchak Prapancha, Shakuntala, Priyadarsika and Pikdoot. He also wrote some Hindi and Urdu poems. He was the one who introduced "Ghazals" in Nepali literature. His sher "Dui aankhi bhau ta tayaar chhan tarbar po kina chahiyo, timi aafai malik bhaigayeu sarkar kina chahiyo" is quite famous for the ghazal lovers in Nepal which translates to "Two eyebrows are sharp enough, why there be a need for sword, you happen to be a monarch yourself, why there be a need for vote?"

Notable works 
Nepali
Manod Beg Prawah (Poetry collection,1942 BS)
Pralahad Bhakti Katha (Epic, 1943 BS)
Gajendra Moksha (Epic, 1944 BS)
Shakunouti (Study of omens, 1944 BS)
Swapna Adhyaya (Study of Dreams, 1944 BS)
Gafastak (1944 BS)
Shakuntal (Play, 1944 BS)
Sangeet Chandrodaya (Ghazals, 1944 BS)
Panchak Prapancha (Epic, 1944 BS)
Usha Charitra (Epic, 1944 BS) 
Anupras Manjari (1944 BS) 
Chanakya Neeti (1945 BS) 
Padmavati (Play, Incomplete, 1945 BS) 
Pikdoot (Epic, 1945 BS)
Kashiraj Chandrasena (Epic, 1945 BS)
Gulsanovar (Fiction, 1945 BS)
Ukhanko Bakhan 
Kaal Bhramar Sambad (Epic) 
Baal Jibbarnan (Poem) 
Priyadarsika (Play, 1948 BS)
Kabi Bhanubhakta Ko Jivan Charitra (Bhanubhakta Acharya's biography and criticism, 1891(1948 BS))
Teej ko Katha
Urdu
 Husna Afroz Aaram Dil (Play)

Legacy 
Motiram Jayanti, his anniversary is celebrated every year by the Nepali literary community on the day of Kushe Aunsi (Nepalese father's day). The award is presented every year on his anniversary.

His biography—Kabi Motiram Bhattako Sachitra Charitra Barnan, was written by his maternal uncle and fellow littérateur Nara Dev Pandey.

References

1866 births
1896 deaths
Nepalese male poets
Bahun
19th-century Nepalese writers
Nepali-language poets
Khas people
Nepalese dramatists and playwrights
Nepalese essayists
People from Kathmandu District
Nepalese ghazal singers
Durbar High School alumni
19th-century Nepalese poets
Nepalese publishers (people)
National heroes of Nepal
Nepalese Hindus